Cuminum is a genus of four flowering plants in the family Apiaceae. The most significant is Cuminum cyminum, source for the cumin seeds that are a popular spice.

References

Apioideae